Rainbow Saver Anglia Credit Union Limited was a not-for-profit member-owned financial co-operative, based in Lowestoft and operated through 18 collection points in the East Anglian counties of Suffolk, Cambridgeshire and certain districts of Norfolk. It was established in 1999 and had 3,500 members. 

In 2021, the Board of Directors announced a planned controlled closure of the credit union. 

In 2022, Rainbow Saver Anglia Credit Union was placed into administration and ceased trading. At the same time, the Financial Services Compensation Scheme declared it as failed (in default).

Activities
Rainbow Saver Anglia Credit Union operated for the purpose of promoting thrift, providing credit and other financial services to its members at reasonable rates. In addition to the Lowestoft head office, it opened a branch in Peterborough in 2013, which traded as Peterborough Rainbow Savers.

Originally limited to members of Anglia Regional Co-operative Society, membership of Rainbow Saver Anglia Credit Union was restricted by common bond to corporate bodies or individuals living, working, studying or volunteering in the counties of Suffolk and Cambridgeshire (including the City of Peterborough unitary authority area) and the districts of South Norfolk and the Borough of Great Yarmouth. Individuals associated with certain employers by virtue of the provision of housing, education, welfare or support services or related to and living in the same household as a member were also eligible.

In 2014, the credit union was awarded a grant of £20,000 by the Lloyds Banking Group Credit Union Development Fund to assist with the process of merging with Eastern Savings and Loans in the near future, subject to a vote of members.

Products
Rainbow Saver Anglia Credit Union ran a payroll deduction savings and loans scheme in conjunction with Addenbrooke's Hospital and a number of local authorities. The credit union was responsible for the operation of the scheme, with the employer facilitating monthly deductions from salary. A payment card, accepted at Post Office and PayPoint outlets, was issued free of charge on request.

Credit unions do not pay a fixed rate of interest on savings balances. Instead, they distribute any trading surplus to members in the form of an annual dividend calculated on average savings or as a rebate of loan interest paid. 

Rent processing enables members to have housing benefit paid direct to landlords; the credit union made a small charge to the landlord for this service. The ABCUL Credit Union Prepaid Card, issued on behalf of Rainbow Saver Anglia Credit Union by Clydesdale Bank, functioned in a similar way to a High Street bank account.

A member of the Association of British Credit Unions Limited, registered under the Industrial and Provident Societies Acts, Rainbow Saver Anglia Credit Union was authorised by the Prudential Regulation Authority and regulated by the Financial Conduct Authority and PRA. Ultimately, like the banks and building societies, members’ savings were protected against business failure by the Financial Services Compensation Scheme.

See also
Credit unions in the United Kingdom
Anglia Regional Co-operative Society

References

External links
Rainbow Saver Anglia Credit Union
Association of British Credit Unions

Credit unions of the United Kingdom
Companies based in Suffolk
British companies established in 1999
Banks established in 1999
Lowestoft